Tūrangawaewae Marae is located in the town of Ngāruawāhia in the Waikato region of the North Island of New Zealand. A very significant marae, it is the headquarters for the Māori King Movement (Te Kīngitanga) and the official residence and reception centre of the head of the Kīngitanga - the current Māori King,  Tuheitia Paki.

The name Tūrangawaewae  means a place to stand.

Building
Ngāti Tamaoho hapu under the leadership of Princess Te Puea Herangi began by clearing swampy land overgrown with scrub and blackberry vines, including an area that had been used recently as a rubbish dump in August 1921.

The marae's buildings include the carved Mahinarangi meeting house, built in 1929, and next to it, Turongo House, the Māori King or Queen's official residence, built in 1938. The two houses are named after Mahinarangi, an East Coast "princess", and her husband Tūrongo, a Tainui chief. The link this marriage formed between the two tribal regions was highlighted by Sir Āpirana Ngata when Te Puea was debating a name for the house. Ngata and his tribe, Ngāti Porou, had contributed thousands of pounds in funding by supporting performances by Te Puea's concert party when it travelled the East Coast region. In addition he sent expert carvers and weavers to assist with the construction of the building. To commemorate this he asked that the meeting house be named after the East Coast ancestress to salute the ancient link and the modern day koha (gift) Ngāti Porou had provided.

The death and suffering of local Māori caused by the 1918 flu pandemic still remained fresh in the memory of Tūrangawaewae residents and Te Puea's original vision for Mahinarangi was to be a hospital for the Māori community so they could receive treatment in a traditional manner. However the Ministry of Health would not grant the necessary permits for it to be used this way. Thus the building was made into a reception hall of sorts and has hosted many foreign dignitaries. A visiting New Zealand prime minister commented at the conclusion of a visit with King Korokī that the house was a fine sitting room for a king. This comment gave Te Puea an idea: what use is a sitting room if there isn't a house to entertain visiting guests properly?

Thus Turongo house was born. This exquisitely carved home was the brain child of Te Puea. Having noticed a home in Hamilton with a hexagonal tower in the corner she came up with a blueprint that incorporated both Māori and European architectural styles. The house's interior and exterior surfaces have been carved extensively and have incorporated many symbols important to the Kīngitanga movement. A seven-sided tower in the corner represents the seven initial waka that, according to tradition, brought the Māori people to their new home of Aotearoa. It also has some unique features such as untreated ponga log cladding on the exterior walls. There are also two pataka (store houses) acting as dormer windows on the roof and storing important taonga (treasures) of the Kīngitanga. Each one represents the Māori and Pākehā influence on the local people. The modern day house contains magnificent reception rooms, dining rooms and kitchens that are suitable for the Arikinui to host guests in a distinctly Māori fashion.

Some of Te Puea's main goals for the movement were to increase the mana or prestige of the Kīngitanga and its figurehead the Arikinui by:

 Raising the standards of health, housing and employment of the people
 Establishing a national marae complex at Ngāruawāhia (Tūrangawaewae Marae) that would be a centre of Māori culture and politics, thus creating a strong sense of community, pride and more importantly, mana amongst the Kīngitanga.

Modern use

Tūrangawaewae, along with the Kīngitanga movement and the office of the Arikinui, has become a key institution to showcase Māoridom not only in New Zealand but the world. World leaders including Nelson Mandela, Queen Elizabeth II and many of her children have paid courtesy visits to Te Arikinui and the people of the Kīngitanga.

Under the leadership of Te Puea strong relationships had been established with the Polynesian royal families of the Cook Islands, Samoa and Tonga. As a result, during the annual Koroneihana (coronation) festivities, representatives of the Polynesian royal houses including the late Queen Salote of Tonga and many of her descendants have made many visits and gifted highly prized taonga to the Arikinui which are now housed in the dual pataka of Turongo.

Tūrangawaewae Marae and its unique buildings are a physical representation of the determination of the Kīngitanga to not only survive the last 200 years of turmoil, but to prosper and flourish under the leadership of monumental leaders like Te Puea and Te Arikinui Dame Te Atairangikaahu.

In October 2020, the Government committed $370,730 from the Provincial Growth Fund to upgrade the marae, creating 30 jobs.

References

Further reading
 

 Turangawaewae
Māori politics
Marae in New Zealand
Ngāruawāhia
1920s architecture in New Zealand
1930s architecture in New Zealand
Waikato Tainui people